Perrin Busbee (February 10, 1872 – January 9, 1935) was an American football and baseball coach.  He served as the head football coach at North Carolina College of Agriculture and Mechanic Arts, now North Carolina State University, in 1892 again from 1896 to 1897, compiling a record of 3–2.  Busbee was also the first head baseball coach at the University of North Carolina at Chapel Hill, coaching from 1891 to 1893 and tallying a mark of 9–6.

On Jan. 9, 1935, he died in Raleigh and is buried in Oakwood Cemetery.

Head coaching record

Football

See also
 List of college football head coaches with non-consecutive tenure

References

External links
 

1872 births
1935 deaths
NC State Wolfpack football coaches
North Carolina Tar Heels baseball coaches
Sportspeople from Raleigh, North Carolina